Zeze may refer to:

People
 Zezé (footballer, 1899-unknown), full name José Carlos Guimarães, Brazilian football winger
 Zezé Procópio (1913-1980), Brazilian football midfielder
 Zezé Macedo (1916-1999), Brazilian comedienne and actress
 Zezé Moreira (1917-1998), Brazilian footballer and football manager
 Zezé Gonzaga (1926-2008), Brazilian singer and entertainer
 Zézé (footballer, 1942-2006), full name José Gilson Rodriguez, Brazilian football forward
 Zezé Motta (born 1944), Brazilian actress and singer
 Zezé Polessa (born 1953), Brazilian actress
 Zézé Gamboa (born 1955), Angolan filmmaker
 Zezé Perrella (born 1956), Brazilian politician
 Zezé (footballer, 1957-2008), Brazilian football centre-forward
 Takahisa Zeze (born 1960), Japanese film director and screenwriter
 Zezé Assis (1962-2007), Angolan basketball player
 Zezé Di Camargo (born 1963), Brazilian singer, part of the Zezé Di Camargo & Luciano musical duo
 Zézé (basketball) (born 1966), full name Maria José Bertolotti, Brazilian basketball player
 Venance Zézé (born 1981), Ivorian football midfielder
 Anderson Lago Zeze (born 1989), Ivorian football midfielder
 Méba-Mickaël Zeze (born 1994), French sprinter
 Ryan Zeze (born 1998), French athlete

Places
 Zeze Castle, Japanese castle
 Zeze Domain, Japanese feudal domain
 Zeze Station, Japanese railway station in Ōtsu
 Keihan Zeze Station, Japanese railway station in Ōtsu,
 Zeze High School, Japanese high school

See also
 Zeze (instrument), African stringed instrument
 Zeze ware, type of Japanese pottery
 "Zeze" (song), 2018 rap song by Kodak Black
 "Zezé", a song by IU from her 2015 EP Chat-Shire